Collagenous fibroma (also known as "desmoplastic fibroblastoma") is a slow-growing, deep-set, benign fibrous tumor, usually located in the deep subcutis, fascia, aponeurosis, or skeletal muscle of the extremities, limb girdles, or head and neck regions. The World Health Organization, 2020, reclassified desmoplastic fibroblastoma/collagenous figromo as a specific benign tumor type within the broad category of fibroblastic and myofibroblastic tumors.

See also
Skin lesion

References

Dermal and subcutaneous growths